Ceres Esporte Clube is a football club in the city of Ceres, in the state of Goiás who has already disputed the three divisions of Campeonato Goiano.

History
Founded on July 16, 1947 in the city of Ceres in the state of Goiás, the club is affiliated to Federação Goiana de Futebol 
and the last professional championship disputed by the club was in 2017, when it disputed the Campeonato Goiano (Third Division).

Titles
 Campeonato Goiano (Second Division) (1966, 1968 and 1992) 
 Campeonato Goiano (do Interior) (1959 and 1964)

References 

Association football clubs established in 1947
Football clubs in Goiás